Igeshaush (fl. late 3rd millennium BCE) was the 6th Gutian ruler of the Gutian Dynasty of Sumer mentioned on the "Sumerian King List" (SKL). Igeshaush was the successor of Inimabakesh. Yarlagab then succeeded Igeshaush.

See also

 History of Sumer
 List of Mesopotamian dynasties

References

Gutian dynasty of Sumer